Marginella mirandai is a species of sea snail, a marine gastropod mollusc in the family Marginellidae, the marginellids.

Description
The shell attains a length of  6.7 mm.

Distribution
This species occurs off and is endemic to São Tomé and Príncipe Islands in the Gulf of Guinea, West Africa.

References

External links
 Marginellidae at Gastropods.com

mirandai
Endemic fauna of São Tomé and Príncipe
Invertebrates of São Tomé and Príncipe
Gastropods described in 2014